Władysław Śmigielski (23 June 1937 – 19 June 1995) was a Polish field hockey player. He competed in the men's tournament at the 1960 Summer Olympics.

References

External links
 

1937 births
1995 deaths
Polish male field hockey players
Olympic field hockey players of Poland
Field hockey players at the 1960 Summer Olympics
Sportspeople from Poznań